Dame Raigh Edith Roe  (12 December 1922 – 3 November 2014) was an Australian farmer, who became an advocate for rural women in Australia and around the world. She was member of the Australian Country Women's Association (CWA) from 1941; she became branch president, Western Australian state president and, eventually, national president of the CWA.

In 1977 she was elected World President of the Associated Country Women of the World (ACWW), representing almost nine million women in 74 countries throughout the world. In 1978, she was appointed as a commissioner for the Australian Broadcasting Commission (ABC).

A biography of Roe, She's No Milkmaid, written by Rica Erickson and Rona Haywood, was published by Hesperian Press in 1991.

Honours
In 1975, Raigh Roe was appointed a Commander of the Order of the British Empire (CBE). In 1980, she was made a Dame Commander of the Order of the British Empire (DBE).

In 1977 she was named Australian of the Year, jointly with Sir Murray Tyrrell.

In 2001 she was awarded the Centenary Medal.

References

External links
Associated Country Women of the World

1922 births
2014 deaths
Australian Dames Commander of the Order of the British Empire
Australian farmers
Australian of the Year Award winners
Board members of the Australian Broadcasting Corporation
People from Western Australia
Recipients of the Centenary Medal